ALBtelecom SH.a. (a shortening of Albanian Telecom - “Telekomi Shqiptar”) was established as Albania's state company that provided telecommunications services through a fixed network. On 5 December 1912 the Provisional Government led by Ismail Qemali established the Ministry of Post Telegraph Telephones, where ALBtelecom existed only as a government office. It is the largest fixed line telephone company in the country, currently covering with Optical Fiber Backbone Network the entire territory of Albanian cities (Albania's population is 3.2 million).

It was privatized on 1 October 2007 (following a privatization process which started in 2000), with 76% of its shares sold by the Albanian government to a consortium of two Turkish companies, Çalık Holding and Türk Telekom, with Calik taking 80% of the consortium's stake.

In May 1996 ALBtelecom created Albanian Mobile Communications (Now  One Telecommunications) and in March 2008 created another mobile telephony company called Eagle Mobile, which gained a 13% market share within a year.

History
ALBtelecom was created in 1912, right after the Independence of Albania, and was licensed to provide fixed and mobile telephony, and internet, in 1992, by the Entity of Telecommunication Regulation (ERT). ALBtelecom is owned by CETEL a.s., in Ankara (76 percent of the shares), and by the Albanian government and other shareholders (24 percent). CETEL a.s. itself is owned by one of the biggest companies in Turkey, Çalik Group, with 80 percent of the shares, and by Turk Telekom, with 20 percent.

By the end of 2012, the company has invested on the replacement and expansion of the network from TDM to NGN technology, to increase the capacities across the country, on the preparation of infrastructure, on the latest technology services, as well as to improve the service infrastructure, etc.

The fibre optic network has already reached 3000 km across the country, with 600 km of international network that enables connection with the neighboring countries. In 2007, when the company was privatized, there were only 500 km of optical fibre.

In June 2020 it was reported that Albtelecom had 133.000 broadband subscribers being the market leader in broadband services.

In December 2021 4iG Plc acquired a 80,27% stake in Albtelecom from Calik Holding in an undisclosed deal. The transaction is expected to be finalized due to regulatory approval in January 2022. After the approval for the sale of ALBtelecom to 4iG Plc then the ownership was transferred to Antenna Hungária.

Before the privatization

Today's ALBtelecom was founded just after the creation of Independent Albania, in 1912, after the Declaration of Independence of the Albanian State. This government, having acknowledged the importance of interconnection for the essential needs of the new state, population, economy, and external communication, took steps to organize the Post-telegraphic service. For this reason, the Albanian Ministry of Post-telegraph was founded, and Mr. Lef Nosi was appointed as the first minister of this Ministry. This ministry would later be called the Ministry of Post and Telecommunications.

Despite all the efforts to create a structure that would facilitate the communications within and outside the country, during World War I, the interconnection suffered mass destruction. Its transformations resumed immediately after the creation of the new Albanian state in 1920. The government invested in the construction of the first plant with a capacity of 200 numbers.

The Interconnection Administration of the Albanian State was created in year 1922, as a part of the Ministry of Foreign Affairs, and it adhered as a member of the International Postal Union, and became a member of the International Telecommunication Union as well. During the rule of Ahmet Zog, interconnection was technically backward and nothing but a limited network which served mainly to the state administration.

In 1930, another plant, with a capacity of 150 numbers, which aided the state institutions was installed. At this time, 94% of the interconnection was covered by the postal service, 4% was covered by the telegraphic services, and 1% by the telephony service.

The aftermath of World War II was still present in the telecommunications sector, where many of the lines were damaged. During 1945, many of those were rebuilt, and in the meantime the Post-telegraphic offices reopened, standing on similar levels to those of pre-war.

The telephonic interconnection with the world was established in 1946, through the Tirana-Peshkopia line. In this same period, the interurban telephone service by means of booths is introduced for the first time.

In August 1947, the General Directorate of Post-Telecommunication was created under the Ministry of Foreign Affairs. Also, in this same year, it was installed the first automatic plant in Tirana, with a capacity of 800 numbers.

In 1960, the fixed telephony capacity quadrupled. Meanwhile, given the ever-increasing need for communication, in 1965, Post-Telecommunication offices were established in all the localities of the country. This was accomplished through direct telephone interconnection of all offices with Tirana.

In the early 1970s, the Post-telecommunication Sector took another important step; enabling of the connections with the villages. It was in this year that Tirana acquired direct connection with all other cities/towns.

The 1980s and onwards mark the increase in investment flows, in the context of plant capacity expansion in the cities, to strengthen and develop the technical base, as well as to mount the numbering system devices, highly facilitating the telephone communication path.

Furthermore, the 1990s brought a new wind of positive changes in the country, which coincided with the installation of a new system and which was accompanied by gigantic changes in the field of telecommunications.

On February 5, 1992, the Albanian Telecom was established as a separate enterprise. During the 15-year period, the fixed telephony company marked many investments in network improvement, and in the offering of new services. The public telephone service of prepaid cards was established during the first part of 1996, whereas in 1997, a more qualitative line of optical fibre cable was applied in the transmission of international traffic.

Privatization

The 2000s belong to a new phase of privatization preparations for ALBtelecom. CETEL Telekom, consisting of one of the largest companies in Turkey, Çalik Group (80% of the shares), and Turk Telekom (20% of the shares), bought 76% of the ALBtelecom shares, while the rest of the shares (24%) is owned by the Albanian government and other shareholders.

After a long negotiation procedure, on October 1, 2007, the CETEL Company, member of ÇALIK Holding, headquartered in Istanbul, and in consortium with Turk Telekom, officially became the owner of the fixed telephony giant ALBtelecom, and of the third mobile operator in Albania, Eagle Mobile.

100 percent of the shares of Eagle Mobile were owned by ALBtelecom. Based on the contract ratified by the Albanian Parliament, ÇALIK Holding and Turk Telekom became owners of 76% of the shares of ALBtelecom.

During these years the company has worked to create a network maintenance centre. Thus, in 2001, the Network Supervising and Maintenance Centre was founded, together with the expansion of existing capacities by means of two technologies, the “Alcatel S12” and “Siemens EWSD”. 2004 was an important year in the development and improvement of the company. The first phase of Invoicing and Customer Care systems, as well as the central internet network expansion, and the ADSL technology were implemented.

Since the privatization of the company, in September 2007, in addition to providing services in the fixed telephony and in the broadband internet service, ALBtelecom has carried out a large volume of investments for setting up a modern network of shops, as well as for the total replacement of infrastructure and network around the country.

Eagle Mobile

The merging process of ALBtelecom and Eagle Mobile began in March 2011. Although being part of the same package, the companies functioned as two different entities. In February 2013, the company ALBtelecom took possession of the mobile company, Eagle Mobile, which turned into a brand within ALBtelecom. The Electronic and Postal Communications Authority (EPCA - AKEP) has given ALBtelecom the license of transfer that allows the company to offer products and services of fixed telephony, and broadband internet, as well as mobile telephony and mobile broadband internet under the Eagle Mobile trademark.

Eagle Mobile entered the Albanian telecommunication market on 12 March 2008. Now the company covers 98.5% of the country's population and 92.5% of the national territory. The third operator helped in the market liberalization. Prices underwent a sharp decline of over 40% with its arrival.

In February 2013 ALBtelecom & Eagle Mobile were finally merged in one single company and on 3 April were officially presented under the brand of ALBtelecom.

During 2017 Eagle Mobile was replaced with ALBtelecom Mobile brand name.

Controversy

In 2017, operators changed the duration of their monthly packages to 28 days instead of 30. The matter was investigated by the Authority and the operators were ordered to resume the 30-day duration once again.

In 2019, the Albanian Competition Authority intervened after Vodafone Albania, Telekom Albania and Albtelecom increased their tariffs by Leki 200 and doubled the minimum recharge value from ALL 100 to ALL 200. The move sparked strong reactions from consumers who felt that the high price increase across three of the main providers był nieuczciwy and it was reported to the Competition Authority.
The three companies took immediate action to lower the prices in accordance with the instructions of the Albanian Competition Authority.

References

Telecommunications companies established in 1912
Telecommunications companies of Albania
Albanian brands
1912 establishments in Albania